Joseph Ahanda (born 3 July 1960) is a Cameroonian boxer. He competed in the 1980 Summer Olympics.

References

1960 births
Living people
Boxers at the 1980 Summer Olympics
Cameroonian male boxers
Olympic boxers of Cameroon
Bantamweight boxers
20th-century Cameroonian people